Big Splash is a waterpark in Canberra, Australia. It is located in the suburb of Macquarie and is the only waterpark in Canberra. It opened in 1969 as a public swimming pool, and has since become a private waterpark.

History

The establishment was originally government-owned and known as "Macquarie Swimming pool", also often referred to as "Jammo Pool". The slides were introduced in the early 1980s. During the 1990s the pool was sold to the Watkins family.

The current name for the facility is "Big Splash Waterpark". Upon opening, it contained only a  pool and a kids pool. It now has a total of eleven water slides, which includes the Family Slide and the Kamikaze slide that extend downwards from the top of Splash Tower, The Hurricane Twins that begin at the Splash Viewing Platform. Big Splash includes a children's area called Splash Island which includes 3 slides and playing area. There was the Yellow Bubble pool for toddlers, which had two small water slides landing into shallow water. However this was removed in the 2014/2015 season and a new playground was installed for smaller children. There is also a "Learn to Swim Pool" and a  Pool. Big Splash also has a dry Inflatable Obstacle Course for Children, and wet Inflatable Obstacle Courses for Adults and Children.

Following the 2010 closures of the Speedcoaster and Twister slides at Wet'n'Wild Gold Coast on the Gold Coast, Watkins personally purchased both rides for $1.5 million. The rides were installed in 2012, but red tape delayed their opening until 2013. The slides were actually purchased for a reduced price by  Wet 'n Wild. 

For the 2014/2015 season the longstanding historic "yellow bubble" was removed and a new toddlers playground installed. Big Splash used to run dive in movies, however frequent crowd cancellations led to its closure. The facility is closed over winter and is open from November to March.

References

External links
 
 Big Splash Waterpark on Facebook

Water parks in Australia
Tourist attractions in Canberra
Buildings and structures in Canberra
1960s establishments in Australia
1960 establishments in Australia